Andrew Nicholl RHA (4 April 1804 – 16 April 1886) was an Irish painter. He was a founding member of the Belfast Association of Artists and in 1847 was elected as an associate member to the Royal Hibernian Academy, becoming a full member in 1860.

Early life
Nicholl was born in Belfast on 4 April 1804, the second son of Henry Nicholl, a bootmaker. In 1822, at the age of 18, he was apprenticed to printer Francis Dalzell Finlay for seven years. He worked as a compositor on The Northern Whig which was founded in 1824. Though he worked in the letterpress department, drawing and painting was an interest from childhood. He received encouragement from his older brother, painter William Nicholl (1794-1840), and possibly some instruction.

Career
He found patronage under Sir James Emerson Tennent, who funded a trip to London in 1830-1832. He exhibited his work at the RHA in Dublin and at the Royal Academy, London.

Tennent's patronage also secured for him an appointment as teacher of landscape drawing, painting and design at the Colombo Academy (later Royal College, Colombo) in Sri Lanka. He rewarded his patron (by then Colonial Secretary) by illustrating parts of the latter's descriptive book about the island, Ceylon, Physical, Historical and Topographical. A watercolour entitled The Great Sphinx with a pyramid of Khufu and another boat of Aden indicate other travel.

He died at Camberwell on 16 April 1886 and was buried at West Norwood Cemetery.  The Ulster History Circle has a blue plaque to him at his birth house at 10 Church Lane, Belfast.

Legacy

Queen Victoria purchased several of his drawings in 1858 and 1870. The Ulster Museum has a collection of about 380 of his watercolours and drawings. A book containing brief biographical details and reproductions of Nicholl's 1828 paintings of the Antrim coast was privately published by the Glens of Antrim Historical Society in about 1983.

See also
List of Northern Irish artists

References

External links

 
NICHOLL, ANDREW, R.H.A. National Library of Ireland online text from by Walter G. Strickland A dictionary of Irish artists, one hundred and fifty portraits Dublin, London, Maunsel & company, limited, 1913
Nicholl at Vauxhall Society
BBC

1804 births
1886 deaths
19th-century Irish painters
Irish male painters
Artists from Belfast
Burials at West Norwood Cemetery
Faculty of Royal College, Colombo
Sri Lankan educators
19th-century Irish male artists